Biological Trace Element Research is a journal established in 1979 and published by Springer Science+Business Media. The editor-in-chief is M.F. Flores-Arce (International Association of Bioorganic Scientists). According to the Journal Citation Reports, the journal has a 2020 impact factor of 3.738.

References

External links 
 

Springer Science+Business Media academic journals
Publications established in 1979
Biochemistry journals
Monthly journals